Kelede Nathan Oduwa (born 5 March 1996) is a professional footballer who plays as a winger for Turan Tovuz. He has represented England at the under-17, under-18, and under-20 levels, and Nigeria at the under-23 level.

Club career

Tottenham Hotspur
Born in Bloomsbury, Greater London, Oduwa joined Tottenham Hotspur at the age of 11 and progressed through the club's youth system, signing his first professional contract in July 2012. He played for the club's under-18 team, making 24 appearances and scoring 10 goals during the 2013–14 season. Oduwa was promoted to the under-21 team for the subsequent season, scoring four goals.

On 2 February 2015, Oduwa joined League Two club Luton Town on loan until the end of the 2014–15 season. He made his Football League debut on 7 February as a 59th-minute substitute for Shaun Whalley in a 1–1 draw with Oxford United at the Kassam Stadium. He completed the loan spell with 11 appearances for Luton, eight of which came as a substitute.

On 13 August 2015, Oduwa, alongside Spurs teammate, Dominic Ball, signed for Scottish Championship club Rangers on season-long loans. He debuted three days later as a 61st-minute substitute for Barrie McKay in a 5–1 away win over Alloa Athletic. During the match, he sparked controversy by performing a rainbow flick, which an Alloa defender called "disrespectful". Oduwa scored his first goal for the Ibrox club in a 4–0 home win over Dumbarton on 1 December. By late October, he had managed four assists, as well as winning several penalties. However, as Rangers sought more permanent options in Oduwa's position, his loan spell was cut short, and he returned to Tottenham Hotspur on 17 January 2016.

On 26 February 2016, Oduwa signed for League One club Colchester United on a one-month loan. He made only two appearances for the club, both of which were as a substitute.

On 31 August 2016, Oduwa joined League One club Peterborough United on loan until 2 January 2017. He made his debut for the club in a 2–2 draw at home to Swindon Town on 3 September. Peterborough manager Grant McCann confirmed that Oduwa returned to Tottenham on 1 January, having made nine substitute appearances.

Olimpija Ljubljana
On 14 February 2017, Oduwa signed for Slovenian PrvaLiga club Olimpija Ljubljana on a three-year contract. He debuted on 25 February in a 1–0 defeat away to Maribor. Oduwa left the club on 22 July 2018, after his contract was terminated by mutual consent.

Vejle Boldklub
On 28 September 2018, Vejle Boldklub announced the signing of Oduwa on a three-year contract. On 17 December 2018, Vejle and Oduwa agreed to terminate the players contract before time.

Hapoel Hadera
On 30 January 2019, Oduwa signed for the Israeli Premier League club Hapoel Hadera.

Dundalk
On 10 March 2020, Oduwa signed for League of Ireland Premier Division champions Dundalk.

Shamakhi
On 3 February 2022, Azerbaijan Premier League club Keşla announced the signing of Oduwa on a contract until the end of the 2021–22 season. On 6 April 2022, Keşla FK changed their name to Shamakhi FK.

International career
Oduwa has represented England at multiple youth levels. In September 2015, he was named in the England U20 squad.

On 24 March 2016, Oduwa debuted for Nigeria U23 in a friendly match against Brazil U23, where he replaced Imoh Ezekiel in the final minutes of the match. Oduwa was part of Nigeria U23 team at the Suwon Invitational Tournament in preparation for the Rio 2016 Olympics.

Style of play
Oduwa mainly plays as a left winger, although he is also capable of playing on the right wing. He has a very direct play style, and uses pace, dribbling, and tricks (such as the rainbow flick) to beat opposing defenders. He provides assists with his balls in from wide positions, and also draws a lot of fouls.

Career statistics

Honours
Olimpija Ljubljana
Slovenian PrvaLiga: 2017–18
Slovenian Cup: 2017–18; runner-up: 2016–17

Dundalk
FAI Cup: 2020

References

External links

1996 births
Living people
Footballers from Greater London
People from Bloomsbury
Citizens of Nigeria through descent
Nigerian footballers
Nigeria youth international footballers
English footballers
England youth international footballers
English people of Nigerian descent
Black British sportsmen
Association football wingers
Tottenham Hotspur F.C. players
Rangers F.C. players
Luton Town F.C. players
Colchester United F.C. players
Peterborough United F.C. players
NK Olimpija Ljubljana (2005) players
Vejle Boldklub players
Hapoel Hadera F.C. players
Dundalk F.C. players
English Football League players
Scottish Professional Football League players
Slovenian PrvaLiga players
Danish Superliga players
Israeli Premier League players
League of Ireland players
English expatriate footballers
Nigerian expatriate footballers
Nigerian expatriate sportspeople in Slovenia
Expatriate footballers in Slovenia
Nigerian expatriate sportspeople in Denmark
Expatriate men's footballers in Denmark
Nigerian expatriate sportspeople in Israel
Expatriate footballers in Israel
Expatriate association footballers in the Republic of Ireland
Nigerian expatriate sportspeople in Ireland